Binospirone (MDL-73,005-EF) is a drug which acts as a partial agonist at 5-HT1A somatodendritic autoreceptors but as an antagonist at postsynaptic 5-HT1A receptors. It has anxiolytic effects.

See also 
 Azapirone

References 

Serotonin receptor agonists
Benzodioxans
Imides
Azapirones
Lactams
Cyclopentanes